South is an unincorporated community in Covington County, Alabama, United States.

History
South may be named for a family or its location in the southern part of Alabama. A post office operated under the name South from 1900 to 1910.

References

Unincorporated communities in Covington County, Alabama
Unincorporated communities in Alabama